Akon City is a planned community in the M'bour Department of Senegal by Senegalese singer and entrepreneur Akon. The project was first announced by Akon in 2018. Akon said in October 2022 that construction on the city's first phase would begin construction in 2023 and would open in 2026.

Akon said he was inspired by the movie Black Panther, and he refers to Akon City as a "real-life Wakanda" that uses the latest technologies of blockchain and cryptocurrency.

History 

Akon announced Akoin, a cryptocurrency, at the Cannes Lions International Festival of Creativity in 2018. The announcement mentioned "Akon Crypto City", a new city on  donated by the president of Senegal, as "a first of its kind 100% crypto-based city with Akoin at the center of transactional life."

On January 15, 2020, Akon announced plans for Akon City. In September 2020, Akon unveiled a rendering of a planned development of a futuristic city along the Atlantic coast. The planned city would feature condominiums, offices, parks, a university, an ocean resort, and a 5,000-bed hospital. The city is intended to attract tourists and investors; Akon told international media in August 2020 that he planned to retire there. Later renderings included fewer skyscrapers but retained a futuristic design.

Another Akon City was announced in Uganda on April 6, 2021, by Akon alongside Dr. Chris Baryomunsi, the state minister for Housing and Urban development, after Akon had met and discussed with Ugandan president Yoweri Museveni. Akon further discussed the entire 15-year development project and its alleged benefits to Ugandans in an interview on Uganda's NBS TV with Canary Mugume.

Design 
The project is planned to have large skyscrapers, shopping malls, technology hub, music studios, "Senewood" production facilities, and eco-friendly tourist resorts.

Akon City's development is proposed to be a ten-year project with mixed-use development. Akon says that the city will be a smart city that is eco-friendly and will be powered by renewable energy, including solar power. It is a LEED-certified project. The project's stated primary goal is to stimulate the local economy and to create jobs for local workers. Akon City developers are Los Angeles–based KE International and Dubai-based Bakri & Associates Development Consultants. Hussein Bakri, the CEO of Bakri & Associates, is the lead architect.

As originally announced, Akon City consisted of two phases of development.

Phase 1: Proposed to be completed by 2023 is the construction of roads, a hospital campus, a shopping mall, residential estates, hotels, a police station, a school, a waste facility, parks, and a photovoltaic solar power plant.

Phase 2: The project is proposed to complete between 2024 to 2029.

In an October 2022 interview with DJ Vlad, Akon said that Phase 1 would open by 2026.

Economy

Akon envisions Akoin, a cryptocurrency which he founded, to be the central currency. The Central Bank of West African States, which regulates and issues Senegal's official currency, the CFA franc, described the use of an alternative currency as illegal. The Akoin cryptocurrency began trading in September 2021 at £0.23 (GBP), and as of December 2022, was worth £0.01.

Akon raised funds for the project by selling Tokens of Appreciation (TOA) in a campaign that ended in October 2019; each $1 (USD) donated would be converted to up to four TOA, which would later convert to Akoin. Two years after the TOA campaign concluded, an administrator offered cash refunds for TOA; a year after that offer was made, no refunds have been issued.

Controversy

As of December 2022, the project has not begun construction. In September 2021, locals in Mbodiène cited the coronavirus pandemic as a possible cause for the delay. A local journalist in December 2022 visited the site and, apart from a foundation stone laid in a ceremony in 2020, found no sign of construction. Akon told the BBC, "It wasn't being managed properly. I take full responsibility for that."

A lawsuit has been brought against Akon in the United States by Devyne Stephens for a debt of almost $4 million (USD) borrowed as part of the implementation of his futuristic city project. Akon's team has disputed Stephens' claims as "innuendo and speculation."

References

External links
 Official website

Proposed populated places
Proposed special economic zones
Special economic zones
Planned cities
Neo-futurism architecture
Akon
Populated places in Senegal